Expérgo is the first extended play by South Korean girl group Nmixx. It was released by JYP Entertainment on March 20, 2023, and contains six tracks, including pre-release single "Young, Dumb, Stupid", and the lead single "Love Me Like This".

Background and release
On February 10, 2023, JYP Entertainment announced Nmixx would be releasing their first extended play titled Expérgo on March 20. On February 13, the promotional schedule was released. On February 27, a teaser trailer titled "Secret of Sweet Oasis" was released. On March 2, the track listing was released with "Love Me Like This" announced as the lead single. A day later, the highlight medley video was released. On March 5, the first concept film titled "Dizziness of Freedom" was released, followed by the second concept film titled "Wisdom, Love, Courage" on March 9. On March 13, the first track "Young, Dumb, Stupid" was pre-released alongside its music video. Three days later, the highlight medley video was released. On March 18, the music video teaser for "Love Me Like This" was released. The extended play was released alongside the music video for "Love Me Like This" on March 20.

Composition
Expérgo consists of six tracks. The first track "Young, Dumb, Stupid" was described as a "energetic", "mix-pop" song that crosses hip hop and children's song together. The seond track and lead single "Love Me Like This" was described as a song characterized by hip hop and R&B with lyrics that "express the relation of people, who are able to love themselves and each other". The third track "Paxxword" was described as a song with "powerful and funky groove". The fourth track "Just Did It" was described as a song with lyrics that "express moments when things connects miraculously". The fifth track "My Gosh" was described as a soft pop song characterized by acoustic guitar rhythm that lyrics about "the excitement of spring". The last track "Home" was described as a "hybrid" song that mixes hip hop with "emotional" rhythm.

Promotion
Following the release of Expérgo, on March 20, 2023, Nmixx held a live event called "Docking Station: Expérgo" on YouTube to introduce the extended play and communicate with their fans.

Track listing

Credits and personnel
Credits adapted from Melon.

Studio
 JYPE Studios – recording , mixing  , vocal editing 
 Chapel Swing Studios - mixing 
 821 Sound Mastering – mastering  
 Sterling Sound - mastering 
 Ingrid Studio - vocal editing 

Personnel

 Nmixx – vocals , background vocals 
 Haewon – background vocals 
 Sullyoon – background vocals 
 Bae – background vocals 
 Kyujin - background vocals 
 Frankie Day (The Hub) – background vocals, composition, vocal directing 
 Kriz - background vocals , vocal directing 
 Sound Kim - background vocals 
 Sophia Pae - background vocals 
 Oh Hyun-seon (Lalala Studio) – lyrics 
 Moon Yeo-reum (Jam Factory) – lyrics 
 Lee Seu-ran – lyrics 
 Park Sang-yu (PNP) – lyrics 
 Lee Hye-joon (Onclassa) – lyrics 
 Jennifer Eunsoo Kim – lyrics 
 Jang Eun-ji (153/Joombas) – lyrics 
 Shin Hye-mi (PNP) – lyrics 
 Oh Hyun-seon (Lalala Studio) – lyrics 
 Wkly – lyrics 
 MosPick - lyrics, composition, arrangement 
 Young Chance - lyrics, composition, vocal directing, vocal editing, electronic piano 
 Hezen (Music Cube) - lyrics 
 Jo Yu-ri - lyrics 
 Danke (Lalala Studio) - lyrics 
 Gxxdkelvin - lyrics 
 Brian U (The Hub) – composition, arrangement, vocal directing, keyboard, synthesizer 
 Honey Noise (The Hub) – composition, arrangement, vocal directing, keyboard, synthesizer 
 Brown Panda (The Hub) – composition, arrangement, keyboard, synthesizer 
 Awry (The Hub) – composition , vocal directing 
 Greg Bonnick – composition 
 Hayden Chapman – composition 
 Taet Chesterton – composition 
 Gavin Jones – composition 
 Kenzie - composition 
 Fabien Torsson - composition, arrangement, instruments 
 Harry Sommerdahl - composition, arrangement, instruments 
 Ylva Dimberg - composition 
 Aftrshok - composition, arrangement, vocal directing, keyboard 
 Lee Chan - composition 
 Ayushy (The Hub) - composition, vocal directing 
 Chanti (The Hub) - composition 
 Charlotte Wilson - composition 
 Jacob Aaron (The Hub) - composition, vocal directing 
 LDN Noise – arrangement, instruments 
 Uhm Sae-hee – recording 
 Im Chan-mi - recording 
 Goo Hye-jin - recording , vocal editing 
 Lee Sang-yeop - recording 
 Lee Tae-seop - mixing 
 Tony Maserati - mixing 
 David K. Younghyun - mixing 
 Im Hong-jin - mixing, vocal editing 
 Kwon Nam-woo - mastering 
 Chris Gehringer - mastering 
 Noday - vocal directing 
 Kang Dong-ha - vocal directing, vocal editing, piano 
 Vox Tune – vocal editing 
 Shin Ji-young NYC - vocal editing 
 Jung Eun-kyung - vocal editing 
 Park Seo-hyun - guitars 
 Seo Yu-won - guitars

Release history

References

Nmixx albums
2023 debut EPs
Korean-language EPs
JYP Entertainment EPs